Linda Gregerson (born August 5, 1950) is an American poet and member of faculty at the University of Michigan. In 2014, she was named as a Chancellor of the Academy of American Poets.

Life
Linda Gregerson received a B.A. from Oberlin College in 1971, an M.A. from Northwestern University, an M.F.A. from the University of Iowa Writers Workshop, and her Ph.D. from Stanford University.  She teaches American poetry and Renaissance literature at the University of Michigan, where she has also directed the M.F.A. program in creative writing.

She served as the judge for the 2008 Brittingham Prize in Poetry. Her poems are featured in American Alphabets: 25 Contemporary Poets (2006) and many other anthologies.

Awards
 Kingsley Tufts Poetry Award for Waterborne
 The Poet's Prize finalist
 Lenore Marshall Poetry Prize finalist for The Woman Who Died in Her Sleep
 Levinson Prize from Poetry magazine
 Consuelo Ford Award from the Poetry Society of America
 Isabel MacCaffrey Award from the Spenser Society of America
 2000 Guggenheim Fellowship
 Pushcart Prize.

Bibliography

Poetry 
Collections
 Fire in the Conservatory (1982)
 The Woman Who Died in Her Sleep (1996)
 Waterborne (Houghton Mifflin, 2002)
 Magnetic North (Houghton Mifflin, 2007)
The Selvage (Houghton Mifflin, 2012) 
Prodigal: New and Selected Poems, 1976 to 2014, (Houghton Mifflin, 2015)  
Canopy, Ecco, New York, 2022. 
List of poems

Non-fiction
 The Reformation of the Subject: Spenser, Milton, and the English Protestant Epic (1995)
 Negative Capability: Contemporary American Poetry (2001)

References

External links
Official Home Page

1950 births
Living people
American women poets
Iowa Writers' Workshop alumni
The New Yorker people
Northwestern University alumni
Oberlin College alumni
Place of birth missing (living people)
Stanford University alumni
University of Michigan faculty
American women academics
21st-century American women